The congress on the Dialectics of Liberation was an international congress organised in London between 15 and 30 July 1967.  It was organised by the American educationalist Joe Berke.  The scope of the conference was to "demystify human violence in all its forms, and the social systems from which it emanates, and to explore new forms of action".  A short film, Ah, Sunflower, directed by Robert Klinkert and Iain Sinclair, and featuring R. D. Laing, Allen Ginsberg, Stokely Carmichael and others, was filmed around the Dialectics of Liberation conference.

History
In 1965 R. D. Laing, and colleagues, came together as a community for themselves and people in a state of psychosis. As a result, Kingsley Hall became home to the Philadelphia Association and one of the most radical experiments in psychiatry.

In January 1967, International Times announced that "This summer, in July, the Institute of Phenomenological Studies will make the move. A congress will convene in London on the Dialectics of Liberation. The congress intends to examine and expose the system of societal and inter-personal influences that converge on us from birth. This means clearing the field of all preconceptions regarding who, what and where we are, as well as all manner of socially convenient academic conventions that are propped up by politics, ideology and false philosophical justifications. For we are taught, and coerced, to see things through a filter of politically arrived at and socially sanctioned lies. The entire world as we "know" it must be demystified."

The organizing group consisted of four psychiatrists who were very much concerned with radical innovation in their own field - to the extent of counter-labelling their discipline as anti-psychiatry. The four were Dr. R. D. Laing, Dr. David Cooper, Dr. Joseph Berke and Dr. Leon Redler.

2012 reenactment 
An event was staged in February 2012 at Kingsley Hall which used actors to speak the words of the original contributors to the 1967 event.

References

External links
 The Congress on the Dialectics of Liberation (for the Demystification of Violence), Roundhouse, 15-30 July 1967
 Dialectics 1967 Dialektikon 2012 - International Times, 4 May, 2012

Anti-psychiatry
History of mental health in the United Kingdom